The Oppenheim Toy Portfolio is a nationally recognized independent consumer review of children's media. It was founded in 1989 by child development authors Joanne Oppenheim and her daughter Stephanie Oppenheim. The newsletter is published quarterly and have held an annual series of awards that have gained attention in the industry. They have spoken on children psychology/behavior, toys, and child media on OPRAH, CNN, NBC Nightly News, ABC World News Tonight, MSNBC, Lifetime, and both are Contributors to NBC's TODAY Show.

Books 
With the success of the original newsletter, the Oppenheims published their first book (The Best Toys, Books, Videos and Music for Kids) together with HarperCollins in 1994. They formed their own publishing company in 1998 and began publishing what would become their annual Oppenheim Toy Portfolio guide book. The company also publishes the Read It! Play It! series on childhood literacy.

Award
The awards granted by The Oppenheim Toy Portfolio  cover topics including Toys, Books, Video, Audio, Computers, and special categories like Special Needs, Green Products, and Multicultural Products. Topics are further divided into four age groups: Infants, Toddlers, Preschoolers, and Early School Years. There are four different types of awards:
Platinum Award - Presented for the most innovative and engaging new products of the year. To receive this award, a product must have previously received a Gold Seal Award in the newsletter.
Gold Seal Award - Presented for outstanding new products. All Gold Seal Award recipients enter the finals and can be additionally awarded a Platinum Award at the end of the year.
Blue Chip Classic Award - Presented for outstanding products that were released in previous years.
Special Needs Adaptable Product (SNAP) Award - Presented for products that can be used or easily adapted for children with special needs.
The annual Oppenheim Toy Portfolio guide books collate reviews on all award winning products as well as those that had been listed in the magazine as "Mixed Emotions".

References

External links 
 http://www.toyportfolio.com/SpecialTag.php?SpecialTag=About The Oppenheim Toy Portfolio
 http://www.joanneoppenheim.com
 https://www.scholastic.com/teachers/authors/joanne-oppenheim

Children's media and toys awards
Game awards
American awards
Awards established in 1989
1989 establishments in the United States